George James Molle(1773–1823) was Scottish born (Chirnside, Berwickshire) British soldier who served in India and as lieutenant-governor of Lieutenant-Governor of New South Wales (13 February 1814–12 September 1817). The Molle islands, part of the Whitsunday Islands, are named after him.

References

1773 births
1823 deaths
Lieutenant-Governors of New South Wales